Hungary participated at the 2018 Summer Youth Olympics in Buenos Aires, Argentina from 6 October to 18 October 2018.

Medalists 

Medals awarded to participants of mixed-NOC (combined) teams are represented in italics. These medals are not counted towards the individual NOC medal tally.

Athletics

Badminton

Hungary qualified two players based on the Badminton Junior World Rankings. 

Singles

Team

Basketball

Hungary qualified a girls' team based on the U18 3x3 National Federation Ranking.

 Girls' tournament – 1 team of 4 athletes

Shoot-out contest

Boxing

Girls

Canoeing

Hungary qualified four boats based on its performance at the 2018 World Qualification Event.

 Boys' C1 – 1 boat
 Boys' K1 – 1 boat
 Girls' C1 – 1 boat
 Girls' K1 – 1 boat

Cycling

Hungary qualified a boys' and girls' combined team based on its ranking in the Youth Olympic Games Junior Nation Rankings.

 Boys' combined team – 1 team of 2 athletes
 Girls' combined team – 1 team of 2 athletes

Dancesport

Hungary qualified one dancer based on its performance at the 2018 World Youth Breaking Championship.

 B-Girls – Csepke

Equestrian

Hungary qualified a rider based on its performance at the FEI European Junior Jumping Championships.

 Individual Jumping – 1 athlete

Fencing

Hungary qualified four athletes based on its performance at the 2018 Cadet World Championship.

 Boys' Sabre – Krisztian Rabb
 Girls' Épée – Kinga Dekany
 Girls' Foil – Karolina Zsoldosi
 Girls' Sabre – Liza Pusztai

Gymnastics

Artistic
Hungary qualified two gymnasts based on its performance at the 2018 European Junior Championship.

 Boys' artistic individual all-around – 1 quota
 Girls' artistic individual all-around – 1 quota

Boys

Girls

Multidiscipline

Judo

Individual

Team

Karate

Hungary qualified one athlete based on its performance at one of the Karate Qualification Tournaments.

 Girls' −59kg – Zsófia Baranyi

Modern pentathlon

Hungary qualified one pentathlete based on its performance at the European Youth Olympic Games Qualifier. Hungary also qualified a male athlete based on its performance at the 2018 Youth A World Championship.

 Boys' Individual – Jozsef Tamas
 Girls' Individual – Michelle Gulyas

Shooting

Hungary qualified one sport shooter based on its performance at the 2017 European Championships.

Team

Swimming

Triathlon

Hungary qualified two athletes based on its performance at the 2018 European Youth Olympic Games Qualifier.

Individual

Relay

Weightlifting

Boy

Girl

Wrestling

 Legend
 F — Won by fall
 Qualification Legend: Q=Final A (Gold medal match); qB=Final B (Bronze medal match); qC=Final C (5th Placement match); qD=Final D (7th Placement match); qE=Final E (9th Placement match)

Girls' Freestyle

References

2018 in Hungarian sport
Nations at the 2018 Summer Youth Olympics
Hungary at the Youth Olympics